Alysicarpus glumaceus is a plant in the legume family Fabaceae.

Description
The flowers have pinkish-orange, red or pale purple petals.

Distribution and habitat
Alysicarpus glumaceus is native to tropical Africa, the Arabian Peninsula, the Indian subcontinent and Queensland. In Africa, its habitat is in grasslands.

References

glumaceus
Flora of Africa
Flora of the Arabian Peninsula
Flora of the Indian subcontinent
Flora of Queensland
Plants described in 1791